Seo Jae-gyu (born 27 August 1940) is a South Korean gymnast. He competed in eight events at the 1964 Summer Olympics.

References

1940 births
Living people
South Korean male artistic gymnasts
Olympic gymnasts of South Korea
Gymnasts at the 1964 Summer Olympics
Place of birth missing (living people)